Veerahanumakkanapalya is a village in Pavagada taluk of Tumkur district in Indian state of Karnataka. Located on the Pavagada-Sira road at 24 kilometers from Pavagada, it is only 1 kilometer away from Mangalavada. Veerahanumakkanapalya and Mangalavada are twin villages.

History
The place derives its name from the village Goddess Veerahanumakka.
The place is near to another important village MADDE, 2 km away

Culture
This is a typical Kannada village with mostly Hindu population. People speak Kannada with an exception of people of some castes speaking Telugu. The village celebrates all the Hindu festivals especially Sankranthi, Yugadi (Ugadi), Deepavali (Diwali) and Shivaratri. The annual festival of the village is called "Veerahanumakkana Jathre".

Education
The government school has classes till fourth standard. For middle school and high school one has to go to Mangalavada.

Geography
It is mostly a dry land with less rain fall than the national average. The place is full of small hills.

Economy
The primary source of income for villagers is agriculture. This village houses two small industries one for polythene sheet making and the other is to process groundnut oil.

See also 
 Pavagada
 Tumkur
 Tumkur District
 Taluks of Karnataka

Villages in Tumkur district